William Whitley House State Historic Site is a park in Crab Orchard, Kentucky. It features the home of Kentucky pioneer William Whitley and his wife, sharpshooter Esther Whitley. The home was built as a fortress against Indian attacks sometime between 1787 and 1794. The first brick house in Kentucky, its construction marked a transition in the area from log cabins to more formal homes. The site became part of the park system in 1938, and the house was restored by locals between 1948 and 1955. Additional property has been purchased for the park by the Office of Kentucky Nature Preserves' Kentucky Heritage Land Conservation Fund, including Sportsman's Hill, the first horse racing track west of the Appalachians. In 2019 management of the site was adopted by the Lincoln County Fiscal Court with assistance from local historians.

See also
List of the oldest buildings in Kentucky

References

External links

William Whitley House State Historic Site Kentucky Department of Parks
William Whitley House Heritage Land Office of Kentucky Nature Preserves

Kentucky State Historic Sites
National Register of Historic Places in Lincoln County, Kentucky
Historic house museums in Kentucky
Protected areas established in 1938
Museums in Lincoln County, Kentucky
Protected areas of Lincoln County, Kentucky
Houses in Lincoln County, Kentucky
Houses on the National Register of Historic Places in Kentucky
1938 establishments in Kentucky